Tetsuji Shioda (塩田 徹治) is a Japanese mathematician who introduced Shioda modular surfaces and who used Mordell–Weil lattices to give examples of dense sphere packings. He was an invited speaker at the ICM in 1990.

References
Home page of Tetsuji Shioda

Tetsuji Shioda in the Oberwolfach photo collection

20th-century Japanese mathematicians
Possibly living people
Year of birth missing